The Connacht Schools Junior Challenge Cup is an under-age rugby union competition for schools affiliated to the Connacht Branch of the IRFU.

Competition is confined to students under the age of 16. The final is held in March each year in the Galway Sportsgrounds. It is usually seen as a good forecast as who will win the Connacht Schools Senior Cup in the following years.

Garbally College have been the most successful school in the competition lifting the cup 42 times. They are followed by St Joseph's College, Galway (10 times), Sligo Grammar School (7 times), Coláiste Iognáid, Marist College, Athlone and Ranelagh College (4 times) and Calasanctius College, Oranmore (2 times)

Marist College, Athlone have been the most successful team since the turn of the millennium winning the Junior cup seven times (2000, 2002, 2005, 2007, 2013, 2016 ,2018, 2022).

Competition structure

The Connacht Rugby Schools Cup is a three tier competition.

Junior Cup [Junior A Cup]

The premier competition played by the strongest rugby playing schools in the region. 
Current competition format is two pools [A & B] of three teams playing each other round robin.
The Winners & Runner Up in each pool proceeding to the Semi-Finals. 

 Winner Pool A vs Runner Up Pool B
 Winner Pool B vs Runner Up Pool A

The two other tiers cater for schools who cannot consistently compete at Junior Cup level by reason of playing population or experience.

In total 30 Schools representing all five provincial counties participated in the various Connacht Rugby Junior Schools Cups in 2019.

Connacht Junior Development Cup [Junior B Cup]
Is the Second Tier Competition for schools with established Rugby programs but who due to lower playing numbers or do not have the high level of population experience to consistently compete at Junior Cup Level. 
Nine schools compete in three pools of three, leading to semi-finals and a final.

Connacht Junior Emerging Cup [Junior C Cup]
Is the Third Tier Competition for Schools who have recently introduced Rugby programs within their schools.
Nine schools compete in three pools of three, leading to semi-finals and a final.

The target is for schools to establish themselves within the lowest tier initially, and progress through to the highest tier.

Performance by School

+1 Since 1989 (Excluding 1992-4)
+2 Only counting wins and losing finals since 1989
 Last Updated 15/03/2023

Results

1910
 1915 Galway Grammar School
 1916 Garbally College
 1917 Ranelagh, Athlone
 1918 Colaiste Iognaid
 1919 Ranelagh, Athlone

1920
 1920 Suspended
 1921 Suspended
 1922 Suspended
 1923 Suspended
 1924  St Josephs College, Galway
 1925 Garbally College
 1926 Ranelagh, Athlone
 1927 Garbally College
 1928  St Josephs College, Galway
 1929 Ranelagh, Athlone

1930
 1930  St Josephs College, Galway
 1931 Garbally College
 1932 Suspended
 1933 Suspended
 1934 Garbally College
 1935 Sligo Grammar School
 1936 Suspended
 1937 Garbally College
 1938 Garbally College
 1939 Garbally College

1940
 1940 Garbally College
 1941 Garbally College
 1942 Suspended
 1943 Suspended
 1944 Suspended
 1945 Suspended
 1946 Suspended
 1947 Suspended
 1948 Suspended
 1949 Garbally College

1950
 1950 Garbally College
 1951 Garbally College
 1952 Garbally College
 1953 Garbally College
 1954 Garbally College
 1955 Garbally College
 1956 Garbally College
 1957 Garbally College
 1958 Galway Grammar School
 1959 Sligo Grammar School

1960
 1960 St. Joseph's College, Galway (The Bish)
 1961 Sligo Grammar School/ St Josephs College, Galway
 1962 Sligo Grammar School
 1963  St Josephs College, Galway
 1964  St Josephs College, Galway
 1965 Suspended
 1966 Sligo Grammar School
 1967 Suspended
 1968 Suspended
 1969 Galway Vocational School

1970
 1970 Garbally College
 1971 Garbally College
 1972 Garbally College
 1973 Garbally College
 1974 Garbally College
 1975  St Josephs College, Galway
 1976 Clifden Community School
 1977 Garbally College
 1978 Colaiste Iognaid
 1979 Garbally College

1980
 1980 Garbally College
 1981 Colaiste Iognaid
 1982 Garbally College
 1983 Garbally College
 1984 Garbally College
 1985 Garbally College
 1986 St. Joseph's College, Galway (The Bish)
 1987 Colaiste Iognaid
 1988 Garbally College
 1989 Sligo Grammar School beat Colaiste Iognaid

1990
 1990  St Josephs College, Galway beat Garbally College
 1991  St Josephs College, Galway
 1992 Garbally College
 1993 Garbally College
 1994 Garbally College
 1995 Garbally College beat Marist College, Athlone
 1996 Garbally College beat  St Josephs College, Galway
 1997 Portumna Community School beat St Muredach's College, Ballina
 1998 Garbally College beat Portumna Community School
 1999 Garbally College beat Colaiste Iognaid

2000
 2000 Marist College, Athlone beat Garbally College
 2001 Portumna Community School beat Sligo Grammar School
 2002 Marist College, Athlone beat Garbally College
 2003 Sligo Grammar School beat Garbally College
 2004 Garbally College beat Marist College, Athlone
 2005 Marist College, Athlone beat Summerhill College, Sligo
 2006 Garbally College beat Colaiste Iognaid by 20-12
 2007 Marist College, Athlone beat Garbally College by 10 - 6
 2008 Sligo Grammar School beat Marist College, Athlone by 8 - 5
 2009 Calasanctius College, Oranmore beat Summerhill College, Sligo by 20 - 15

2010
 2010 Calasanctius College, Oranmore beat Rice College by 17-5
 2011 Rice College, Westport beat Calasanctius College, Oranmore by 26-18
 2012 Rice College, Westport beat Sligo Grammar School by 6 - 3 (Replay after 10-10 draw on 13/03/12)
 2013 Marist College, Athlone beat Sligo Grammar School by 22 - 8  
 2014 St. Gerald's College, Castlebar beat CBS Roscommon 36 - 22 
 2015 CBS Roscommon beat Coláiste Iognáid, Galway 36 - 0 
 2016 Marist College, Athlone beat Garbally College by 25 - 0 
 2017 Garbally College, Ballinasloe beat Colaiste Iognaid by 17-13 
 2018 Marist College, Athlone beat Garbally College by 20-17 
 2019 Garbally College, Ballinasloe beat Colaiste Iognaid by 22 – 15.

2020
 2020 CBS Roscommon beat St Muredach's College, Ballina by 12-5
 2021 - No competition due to COVID-19 restrictions.
 2022 Marist College, Athlone beat Sligo Grammar School by 10-7 
 2023  Summerhill College, Sligo beat Marist College, Athlone by 18-3

Other Cup Competitions

Junior Development Cup  [Junior B Cup]

2010
 2010 Clifden CS beat Rice College by 13-7
 2011 Sligo Grammar School beat St. Geralds College, Castlebar by 10-5
 2012 Marist College, Athlone beat Roscommon CBS by 17-5
 2013 Gallen Community School, Ferbane beat Coláiste Iognáid, Galway by 13-7
 2014 Gallen Community School, Ferbane beat Gortnor Abbey by 32-3 
 2015
 2016
 2017 Calasanctius College beat Coláiste Bhaile Chláir, Claregalway by 19-16 
 2018 Presentation College, Athenry beat St. Jarlath's College, Tuam by 30-5 
 2019 St. Jarlath's College, Tuam beat Presentation College, Athenry by 22-15

2020
 2020 Athlone Community College  & Colaiste Einde Galway - Shared due to COVID-19 restrictions.
 2021 No Competition due to COVID-19 Pandemic
 2022 Coláiste Bhaile Chláir  beat Colaiste Einde Galway by 15-12 
 2023 Gort CS beat Colaiste Einde Galway by 13-10

Junior Emerging Cup  [Junior C Cup]

 2008  St Josephs College, Galway) beat Coláiste Iognáid (The Jes)
 2009 Calasanctius College, Oranmore beat Coláiste Iognáid, Galway (The Jes) By 7-5

2010
 2010 Calasanctius College, Oranmore beat Coláiste Iognáid, Galway (The Jes) By 8-6
 2011 Coláiste Iognáid, Galway (The Jes) beat  St Josephs College, Galway)
 2012  St Josephs College, Galway beat Colaiste Einde Galway
 2013  St Josephs College, Galway beat Colaiste Einde Galway
 2014
 2015 St. Jarlath's College, Tuam beat St Tiernan's College, Crossmolina by 19-14
 2016
 2017 Abbey Community College Boyle beat St Joseph's, Foxford by 24-18 
 2018 Abbey Community College Boyle beat St Joseph's, Foxford by 8-5 
 2019 Athlone Community College beat Scoil Chuimsiteach Chiarain, Carraroe by 28-0

2020
 2020 Sancta Maria College, Louisburgh  & Jesus & Mary Secondary School, Enniscrone - Shared due to COVID-19 restrictions.
 2021  No Competition due to COVID-19 Pandemic
 2022  Gort CS beat St. Raphael's College, Loughrea by 19-5
 2023 St. Jarlath's College, Tuam beat Jesus & Mary Secondary School, Enniscrone by 20-10.

Other Competitions

Junior League

2000 
 2005 Garbally College beat Coláiste Iognáid, Galway by 15-13
 2006
 2007 Shared between Marist College, Athlone and Cilfden C.S
 2008
 2009 Calasanctius College, Oranmore beat Sligo Grammar School by 7-0

2010 
 2010 The Bish beat Marist College, Athlone
 2011 Sligo Grammar School
 2017 Garbally College beat Marist College, Athlone by 32-05
 2018 Garbally College beat Marist College, Athlone by 31-17
 2019 CBS Roscommon beat Garbally College, Ballinasloe by 15-7

2020 
 2020 - No Competition due to COVID-19 restrictions.
 2021 - Marist College, Athlone beat St Josephs College, Galway The Bish by 31-24

See also
 Connacht Rugby
 Connacht Schools Senior Cup
 Ulster Schools Junior Cup
 Munster Schools Junior Cup
 Leinster Schools Junior Cup

References

External links
 Connacht Rugby Schools Cup Roll of Honour
 Sligo Grammar School

High school rugby union competitions in Ireland
Rugby union competitions in Connacht
1915 establishments in Ireland